Bilim ve Teknik (English: Science and Technology) is a Turkish popular science magazine, published monthly by the Scientific and Technological Research Council (TÜBİTAK) of Turkey. The first issue was published in October 1967. TÜBİTAK publishes three titles, which appear monthly. Bilim ve Teknik is geared towards adults, Bilim Çocuk (English: Science for Children) is for 7-12 year olds, and Meraklı Minik (English: Curious Puppy) is for pre-schoolers.

External links
 Bilim ve Teknik official website
 Bilim Çocuk official website
 Meraklı Minik official website
 TÜBİTAK E-Magazine Archive official website

1967 establishments in Turkey
Magazines established in 1967
Magazines published in Ankara
Monthly magazines published in Turkey
Popular science magazines
Scientific and Technological Research Council of Turkey
Turkish-language magazines